The Waikiti River is a river of the West Coast Region of New Zealand's South Island. It flows generally north from it sources in the eastern Kaimata Range, roughly paralleling the course of its larger eastern neighbour, the Trent River. It reaches the Ahaura River 20 kilometres southeast of Lake Hochstetter.

See also
List of rivers of New Zealand

References

Rivers of the West Coast, New Zealand
Grey District
Rivers of New Zealand